95–2003 is the second solo album by Polish rock singer Piotr Rogucki, frontman of the band Coma. It was released on June 11, 2012 through Polish label Mystic Production. The album debuted at number 1 on the official Polish sales chart OLiS.

Track listing

Charts

See also
 List of number-one albums of 2012 (Poland)

References

2012 albums
Piotr Rogucki albums
Mystic Production albums
Polish-language albums